The Emirate of Bari was a short-lived Islamic state in Apulia, in what is now Italy, ruled by non-Arabs, probably Berbers and Black Africans. Controlled from the South Italian city of Bari, it was established about 847 when the region was taken from the Byzantine Empire, but fell in 871 to the army of Emperor Louis II.

Foundation
Bari first became the object of Aghlabid raids in late 840 or early 841, when it was briefly occupied. According to Al-Baladhuri, Bari was conquered from the Byzantine Empire by Kalfün around 847, a mawla—perhaps a servant or escaped slave—of the Aghlabid Emir of Africa. Kalfün (Khalfun) was probably of Berber stock, possibly from the Emirate of Sicily originally. The conquest was seen by contemporary Muslims as unimportant, having been carried out by a minor figure without the support of any other Muslim state. However, Kalfün's successor Mufarrag ibn Sallam sent requests to Abbasid caliph al-Mutawakkil in Baghdad as well as to his provincial governor of Egypt asking for recognition of the conquest with the title of wali, a governor ruling over a province of the Caliphate, which was granted. Mufarrag expanded Muslim influence and enlarged the territory of the emirate.

Rule of Sawdan
The third and last emir of Bari was Sawdan, who came to power around 857 after the murder of his predecessor Mufarrag. He invaded the lands of the Lombard Principality of Benevento, forcing Prince Adelchis to pay tribute. In 864 he finally obtained the official investiture requested initially by Mufarrag. In the middle of the 860s, a Frankish monk named Bernard and two companions stopped in Bari on a pilgrimage to Jerusalem. They successfully petitioned Sawdan for letters of safe-conduct all the way through Egypt and the Holy Land. According to the Itinerarium Bernardi, Bernard's record of the event, Bari, the civitatem Sarracenorum, had formerly belonged to the "Beneventans".

The Hebrew Chronicle of Ahimaaz records that Sawdan, the last emir of Bari, ruled the city wisely and was on good terms with the eminent Jewish scholar Abu Aaron. Christian monastic chronicles, however, portray the emir as nequissimus ac sceleratissimus: "most impossible and wicked". Certainly Muslims raids on Christians (and Jews) did not cease during Sawdan's reign. There is evidence for high civilisation in Bari at this point. Giosuè Musca suggests that the emirate was a boon to the regional economy, and that during this time the slave trade, wine trade, and trade in pottery flourished. Under Sawdan the city of Bari was embellished with a mosque, palaces, and public works.

In 859, Lambert I of Spoleto joined Gerard, count of the Marsi, Maielpoto, gastald of Telese, and Wandelbert, gastald of Boiano, to prevent Sawdan from re-entering Bari after a campaign against Capua and the Terra di Lavoro. Despite a bloody battle, the emir successfully entered his capital.

The emirate of Bari lasted long enough to enter into relations with its Christian neighbours. According to the Chronicon Salernitanum, ambassadors (legati) were sent to Salerno where they stayed in the episcopal palace, much to the dismay of the bishop. Bari also served as a refuge for at least one political rival of the Emperor Louis II, a man of Spoleto who fled to it during a revolt.

Fall

In 865, Louis II, perhaps pressured by the Church, always uncomfortable with a Muslim state in Italy's midst, issued a capitulary calling upon the fighting men of northern Italy to gather at Lucera in the spring of 866 for an assault on Bari. It is unknown, from contemporary sources, whether this force ever marched on Bari, but in the summer of that year the emperor was touring the Campania with his empress, Engelberga, and receiving strong urging from the Lombard princes—Adelchis of Benevento, Guaifer of Salerno, and Landulf II of Capua—to attack Bari again.

It was not until the spring of 867 that Louis took action against the emirate. He immediately besieged Matera and Oria, recently conquered, and burnt the former. Oria was a prosperous locale before the Muslim conquest; Barbara Kreutz thus conjectures that Matera resisted Louis while Oria welcomed him: the former thus was razed. This may have severed communications between Bari and Taranto, the other pole of Muslim power in southern Italy. Louis established a garrison at Canosa on the frontier between Benevento and Bari, but retired to the former by March 868. It was probably at about this time that Louis entered into negotiations with the new Byzantine emperor, Basil I. A marriage between Louis's daughter and Basil's eldest son, Constantine, was probably discussed in return for Byzantine naval assistance in the taking of Bari. The Chronicon Salernitanum inconsistently attaches the initiative for such talks to Louis and then Basil.

The joint attack was projected for late in the summer of 869 and Louis remained at Benevento planning as late as June. The Byzantine fleet—of four hundred ships if the Annales Bertiniani are to be trusted—arrived under the command of Nicetas with the expectation that Louis would hand over his daughter immediately. This he refused to do, for no known reason, but perhaps because Nicetas had refused to recognise his imperial title, since Louis later refers in a letter to the commander's "insulting behaviour". Perhaps, however, the fleet simply arrived too late in autumn.

In 870 the Bariot Muslims stepped up their raids, going so far as to ravage the Gargano Peninsula including the Sanctuary of Monte Sant'Angelo. The Emperor Louis organised a response, fighting his way deep into Apulia and Calabria but bypassing major population centres like Bari or Taranto. A few towns were apparently freed of Muslim control and the various Muslim bands encountered were universally defeated. Probably encouraged by these successes, Louis attacked Bari with a ground force of Franks, Germans and Lombards and aided by a fleet of Sclavini. In February 871 the citadel fell and Sawdan was captured and taken to Benevento in chains. The report found in the De Administrando Imperio of Constantine Porphyrogenitus that the Byzantines played a major role in the city's fall is probably a concoction. In the siege of Arab Bari (868–871) participated and Domagoj  with fleet of Ragusa which, according to Constantine VII transported Croats and other Archons of Slavs on their ships to Longobardia.

List of emirs
Kalfün (Khalfun), 841–852
Mufarrag ibn Sallam, 852–857
Sawdan (Sawdān), 857–871

Notes

Bibliography

Primary sources

The following are available as part of Sources of Lombard History at the Institut für Mittelalter Forschung:

Chronica Sancti Benedicti Casinensis
Chronicon Salernitanum 
Erchempert. Historiola 
See too the letter of Emperor Louis II to Emperor Basil I, written in 871 after the capture of Bari, in English translation.

Secondary sources

Di Branco, Marco; Wolf, Kordula. (2013) "Berbers and Arabs in the Maghreb and Europe, medieval era". The Encyclopedia of Global Human Migration, ed. Immanuel Ness, vol. 2. Chichester, pp. 695–702.
Kreutz, Barbara M. (1996) Before the Normans: Southern Italy in the Ninth and Tenth Centuries. Philadelphia: University of Pennsylvania Press. .
Musca, Giosuè (1964). L'emirato di Bari, 847–871. (Università degli Studi di Bari Istituto di Storia Medievale e Moderna, 4.) Bari: Dedalo Litostampa.
Drew, K. F. (1965) Review of L'emirato di Bari, 847–871, Giosuè Musca. The American Historical Review, 71:1 (Oct.), p. 135.
Krueger, Hilmar C. (1966) Review of L'emirato di Bari, 847–871, Giosuè Musca. Speculum, 41:4 (Oct.), p. 761.

Emirate
9th century in Italy
Spread of Islam
Islam in Italy
Former Muslim countries in Europe
871 disestablishments
States and territories established in the 840s
Former emirates
Arab–Byzantine wars
847 establishments
Medieval Apulia